This list of protected areas of Hillerød Municipality is a list of protected areas of Hillerød Municipality, Denmark.

List

See also

References

Protected areas
Hillerod